Asclepias lanuginosa, the woolly milkweed or sidecluster milkweed, is a species of flowering plant in the dogbane family, Apocynaceae, native to central Canada and the upper Midwest United States. It was described in 1818.

References

lanuginosa
Plants described in 1818
Flora of North America